The Sinhala script, also known as Sinhalese script, is a writing system used by the Sinhalese people and most Sri Lankans in Sri Lanka and elsewhere to write the Sinhala language as well as the liturgical languages Pali and Sanskrit. The Sinhalese Akṣara Mālāva, one of the Brahmic scripts, is a descendant of the Ancient Indian Brahmi script. It is also related to the Grantha script.

The Sinhala script is an abugida written from left to right. Sinhala letters are classified in two sets. The core set of letters forms the  alphabet (Pure Sinhala), which is a subset of the  alphabet (Mixed Sinhala).

History
The Sinhala script is a Brahmi derivate and was imported from Northern India around the 3rd century BCE. It developed in a complex manner, partly independently but also strongly influenced by South Indian scripts at various stages, manifestly influenced by the early Grantha script. Pottery from the 6th century BCE has been found in Anuradhapura with lithic inscriptions dating from the 2nd century BCE written in Prakrit.

Medieval Sinhalese, which emerged around 750 AD, is marked by very strong influence from the Grantha script. Subsequently, Medieval (and modern) Sinhalese resemble the South Indian scripts. By the 9th century CE, literature written in the Sinhala script had emerged and the script began to be used in other contexts. For instance, the Buddhist literature of the Theravada-Buddhists of Sri Lanka, written in Pali, used Sinhala script.

Modern Sinhalese emerged in the 13th century and is marked by the composition of the grammar book Sidat Sangara. In 1736, the Dutch were the first to print with Sinhala type on the island. The resulting type followed the features of the native Sinhala script used on palm leaves. The Dutch created type was monolinear and geometric in fashion, with no separation between words in early documents. During the second half of the 19th century, during the colonial period, a new style of Sinhala letterforms emerged in opposition to the monolinear and geometric form that used high contrast and had varied thicknesses. This high contrast type gradually replaced the monolinear type as the preferred style and continues to be used in the present day. The high contrast style is still preferred for text typesetting in printed newspapers, books, and magazines in Sri Lanka.

Today, the alphabet is used by over 16 million people to write Sinhala in very diverse contexts, such as newspapers, TV commercials, government announcements, graffiti, and schoolbooks.

Sinhala is the main language written in this script, but rare instances of its use for writing Sri Lanka Malay have been recorded.

Structure

Sinhala script is an abugida written from left to right. It uses consonants as the basic unit for word construction as each consonant has an inherent vowel, which can be changed with a different vowel stroke. To represent different sounds it is necessary to add vowel strokes, or diacritics called  (Pili), that can be used before, after, above or below the base-consonant. Most of the Sinhala letters are curlicues; straight lines are almost completely absent from the alphabet, and it does not have joining characters. This is because Sinhala used to be written on dried palm leaves, which would split along the veins on writing straight lines. This was undesirable, and therefore, the round shapes were preferred. Upper and lower cases do not exist in Sinhala.

Sinhala letters are ordered into two sets. The core set of letters forms the  alphabet (Pure Sinhala), which is a subset of the  alphabet (Mixed Sinhala). This "pure" alphabet contains all the graphemes necessary to write Eḷu (classical Sinhala) as described in the classical grammar Sidatsan̆garā (1300 AD). This is the reason why this set is also called Eḷu hōdiya ("Eḷu alphabet" ). The definition of the two sets is thus a historic one. Out of pure coincidence, the phoneme inventory of present-day colloquial Sinhala is such that yet again the śuddha alphabet suffices as a good representation of the sounds. This is most notably necessary for the graphemes for the Middle Indic phonemes that the Sinhala language lost during its history, such as aspirates.

Most phonemes of Sinhala can be represented by a śuddha letter or by a miśra letter, but normally only one of them is considered correct. This one-to-many mapping of phonemes onto graphemes is a frequent source of misspellings.

This means that the actual pronunciation of a word is almost always clear from its orthographic form.

Some pronunciation exceptions in Sinhala:

 කරනවා – to do –  (not )
 හතලිහ – forty –  (not )

Diacritics

In Sinhala the diacritics are called පිලි pili (vowel strokes). දිග diga means "long" because the vowel is sounded for longer and දෙක deka means "two" because the stroke is doubled when written.

Non-vocalic diacritics
The anusvara (often called binduva 'zero' ) is represented by one small circle ◌ං (Unicode 0D82), and the visarga (technically part of the miśra alphabet) by two ◌ඃ (Unicode 0D83). The inherent vowel can be removed by a special virama diacritic, the hal kirīma (◌්), which has two shapes depending on which consonant it attaches to. Both are represented in the image on the right side. The first one is the most common one, while the second one is used for letters ending at the top left corner.

Letters

Śuddha set
The śuddha graphemes are the mainstay of Sinhala script and are used on an everyday basis. Every sequence of sounds of Sinhala of today can be represented by these graphemes. These two letters were needed for the representation of Eḷu, but are now obsolete from a purely phonemic view. However, words which historically contain these two phonemes are still often written with the graphemes representing the retroflex sounds.

Vowels

Vowels come in two shapes: independent and diacritic. The independent shape is used when a vowel does not follow a consonant, e.g. at the beginning of a word. The diacritic shape is used when a vowel follows a consonant. Depending on the vowel, the diacritic can attach at several places (see diacritics section above)

While most diacritics are regular, the diacritic for  takes a different shape according to the consonant it attaches to. The most common one is the one used for the consonant ප (p): පු (pu) and පූ (pū). Some consonants ending at the lower right corner (ක (k),ග (g), ත(t), but not න(n) or හ(h)) use this diacritic: කු (ku) and කූ (kuu). Combinations of ර(r) or  ළ(ḷ) with  have idiosyncratic shapes, viz රු (ru) රූ (rū) ළු (ḷu) ළූ (ḷū).

Consonants

The śuddha alphabet comprises 8 plosives, 2 fricatives, 2 affricates, 2 nasals, 2 liquids and 2 glides. These are shaded in the table.

The voiceless affricate (ච ) is not included in the śuddha set by purists since it does not occur in the main text of the Sidatsan̆garā. The Sidatsan̆garā does use it in examples though, so this sound did exist in Eḷu. In any case, it is needed for the representation of modern Sinhala.

The basic shapes of these consonants carry an inherent  unless this is replaced by another vowel or removed by the hal kirīma.

Prenasalized consonants

Vowel diacritics attach in the same way as they would to the corresponding plain plosive.

Miśra set

The miśra alphabet is a superset of śuddha. It adds letters for aspirates, retroflexes and sibilants, which are not phonemic in today's Sinhala, but which are necessary to represent non-native words, like loanwords from Sanskrit, Pali or English. The use of the extra letters is mainly a question of prestige. From a purely phonemic point of view, there is no benefit in using them, and they can be replaced by a (sequence of) śuddha letters as follows: For the miśra aspirates, the replacement is the plain śuddha counterpart, for the miśra retroflex liquids the corresponding śuddha coronal liquid, for the sibilants, .  ඤ (ñ) and  ඥ (gn) cannot be represented by śuddha graphemes but are found only in fewer than 10 words each. ෆ fa can be represented by ප pa with a Latin  inscribed in the cup.

Vowels

There are six additional vocalic diacritics in the miśra alphabet. The two diphthongs are quite common, while the "syllabic" ṛ is much rarer, and the "syllabic" ḷ is all but obsolete. The latter are almost exclusively found in loanwords from Sanskrit.

The miśra  can also be written with śuddha + or +, which corresponds to the actual pronunciation. The miśra syllabic  is obsolete, but can be rendered by śuddha +. Miśra  is rendered as  śuddha , miśra   as śuddha .

This is not very problematic as the second one is extremely scarce.

Consonants

Consonant conjuncts

Certain combinations of graphemes trigger special ligatures. Special signs exist for an ර (r) following a consonant (inverted arch underneath), a ර (r) preceding a consonant (loop above) and a  ය (y) following a consonant (half a ය on the right).

Furthermore, very frequent combinations are often written in one stroke, like ddh, kv or kś. If this is the case, the first consonant is not marked with a hal kirīma.

The image on the right shows the glyph for śrī, which is composed of the letter ś with a ligature indicating the r below and the vowel  ī marked above. Most other conjunct consonants are made with an explicit virama, called al-lakuna or hal kirīma, and the zero-width joiner as shown in the following table, some of which may not display correctly due to limitations of your system. Some of the more common are displayed in the following table. Note that although modern Sinhala sounds are not aspirated, aspiration is marked in the sound where it was historically present to highlight the differences in modern spelling. Also note that all of the combinations are encoded with the al-lakuna (Unicode U+0DCA) first, followed by the zero-width joiner (Unicode U+200D) except for touching letters which have the zero-width joiner (Unicode U+200D) first followed by the al-lakuna (Unicode U+0DCA). Touching letters were used in ancient scriptures but are not used in modern Sinhala. Vowels may be attached to any of the ligatures formed, attaching to the rightmost part of the glyph except for vowels that use the kombuva, where the kombuva is written before the ligature or cluster and the remainder of the vowel, if any, is attached to the rightmost part. In the table below, appending "o" (kombuva saha ælepilla – kombuva with ælepilla) to the cluster "ky"  only adds a single code point, but adds two vowel strokes, one each to the left and right of the consonant cluster.

Letter names
The Sinhala śuddha graphemes are named in a uniform way adding -yanna to the sound produced by the letter, including vocalic diacritics. The name for the letter අ is thus ayanna, for the letter ආ āyanna, for the letter ක kayanna, for the letter කා kāyanna, for the letter කෙ keyanna and so forth. For letters with hal kirīma, an epenthetic a is added for easier pronunciation: the name for the letter  ක් is akyanna. Another naming convention is to use al- before a letter with suppressed vowel, thus alkayanna.

Since the extra miśra letters are phonetically not distinguishable from the śuddha letters, proceeding in the same way would lead to confusion. Names of miśra letters are normally made up of the names of two śuddha letters pronounced as one word. The first one indicates the sound, the second one the shape. For example, the aspirated  ඛ  (kh) is called bayanu kayanna. kayanna indicates the sound, while bayanu indicates the shape: ඛ  (kh) is similar in shape to  බ (b) (bayunu = like bayanna). Another method is to qualify the miśra aspirates by mahāprāna (ඛ: mahāprāna kayanna) and the miśra retroflexes by mūrdhaja (ළ: mūrdhaja layanna).

Numerals

Sinhala had special symbols to represent numerals, which were in use until the beginning of the 19th century.
This system is now superseded by Hindu–Arabic numeral system.

Sinhala Illakkam (Sinhala Archaic Numbers)
Sinhala Illakkam were used for writing numbers prior to the fall of Kandyan Kingdom in 1815. These digits did not have a zero instead the numbers had signs for 10, 20, 30, 40, 50, 60, 70, 80, 90, 100, 1000. These digits and numbers can be seen primarily in Royal documents and artefacts.

Sinhala Lith Illakkam  (Sinhala Astrological Numbers)
Prior to the fall of Kandyan Kingdom all calculations were carried out using Lith digits. After the fall of the Kandyan Kingdom, Sinhala Lith Illakkam were primarily used for writing horoscopes. However, there is evidence that they were used for other purposes such as writing page numbers etc. The tradition of writing degrees and minutes of zodiac signs in horoscopes continued into the 20th century using different versions of Lith Digits. Unlike the Sinhala Illakkam, Sinhala Lith Illakkam included a 0.

Neither the Sinhala numerals nor U+0DF4 ෴  Sinhala punctuation kunddaliya is in general use today, but some use it in social media, Internet messaging and blogs. The kunddaliya was formerly used as a full stop.

Transliteration
Sinhala transliteration (Sinhala: රෝම අකුරින් ලිවීම rōma akurin livīma, literally "Roman letter writing") can be done in analogy to Devanāgarī transliteration.

Layman's transliterations in Sri Lanka normally follow neither of these.
This is presumably because the retroflex plosive  is perceived the same as the English alveolar plosive , and the Sinhala dental plosive  is equated with the English  voiceless dental fricative .

Use for the Pali language
Many of the oldest manuscripts in the Pali language are written in the Sinhala script. Miśra consonants are used to represent Pali phonemes that have no Sinhala counterpart. The following table lays out the Sinhala representations of Pali consonants with their standard academic Romanizations:

The vowels are a subset of those for writing Sinhala:

The  is represented with the sign ං. Consonant sequences may be combined in ligatures in a manner identical to that described above for Sinhala.

As an example, below is the first verse from the Dhammapada in Pali in Sinhala script, followed by Romanization:

Relation to other scripts
Similarities
Sinhala is one of the Brahmic scripts, and thus shares many similarities with other members of the family, such as the Kannada, Malayalam, Telugu, Tamil script and Devanāgarī. As a general example,  is the inherent vowel in all these scripts.

Differences
Sinhala alphabet differs from other Indo-Aryan alphabets in that it contains a pair of vowel sounds (U+0DD0 and U+0DD1 in the proposed Unicode Standard) that are unique to it. These are the two vowel sounds that are similar to the two vowel sounds that occur at the beginning of the English words at (ඇ) and ant (ඈ).

Another feature that distinguishes Sinhala from its sister Indo-Aryan languages is the presence of a set of five nasal sounds known as half-nasal or prenasalized stops.

Computer encoding

Generally speaking, Sinhala support is less developed than support for Devanāgarī, for instance.

Sinhala support did not come built in with Microsoft Windows XP, unlike Tamil and Hindi, but was supported by third-party means such as Keyman by SIL International. Thereafter, all versions of Windows Vista and above, including Windows 10 come with Sinhala support by default, and do not require external fonts to be installed to read Sinhala script. Nirmala UI is the default Sinhala font in Windows 10. The latest versions of Windows 10 have added support for Sinhala Archaic Numbers that were not supported by default in previous versions.

For macOS, Apple Inc. has provided Sinhala font support for versions of macOS that are Catalina and above through Unicode integration. Keyboard support is available by third-party means such as Helakuru and Keyman. In Mac OS X, Sinhala font and keyboard support were provided by Nickshanks and Xenotypetech.

For Linux, the IBus, and SCIM input methods allow the use Sinhala script in applications with support for a number of key maps and techniques such as traditional, phonetic and assisted techniques. In addition, newer versions of the Android mobile operating system also support both rendering and input of Sinhala script by default and applications like Helakuru serve as dedicated keyboard integrators.

Unicode

Sinhala script was added to the Unicode Standard in September 1999 with the release of version 3.0.
This character allocation has been adopted in Sri Lanka as the Standard SLS1134.

The main Unicode block for Sinhala is U+0D80–U+0DFF. Another block, Sinhala Archaic Numbers, was added to Unicode in version 7.0.0 in June 2014. Its range is U+111E0–U+111FF.

See also
 Sinhala Braille
 History of Sinhala software
 Loanwords
 Dutch loanwords in Sinhala
 English loanwords in Sinhala
 Portuguese loanwords in Sinhala
 Tamil loanwords in Sinhala

References

Further reading
 Coperahewa, Sandagomi. Sinhala Akuru Puranaya [Chronicle of Sinhala Letters] Nugegoda: Sarasavi, 2018.

External links

Scripts (ISO 15924) "Sinhala"
Sinhala Unicode Characters
Sinhala Unicode Characters
Sinhala Unicode Character Code Chart
Sinhala Archaic Numbers Unicode Character Code Chart

Complete table of consonant-diacritic-combinations 

Online resources
 Sinhala guide of the Sinhala Wikipedia (in English)
 Online Sinhala Unicode Writer
 Sinhala English Dictionary and Sinhala To Hindi Language Translator
 Sinhala Unicode Support Group
 Online Unicode Converter

 
Brahmic scripts